Christine Hume (born 1968) is an American poet and essayist. Christine Hume is the author of three books of poetry, Musca Domestica (2000), Alaskaphrenia (2004), and Shot (2010) and two works of nonfiction, Saturation Project and Everything I Never Wanted to Know. Her chapbooks include Lullaby: Speculations on the First Active Sense (Ugly Duckling Press, 2008), Ventifacts (Omnidawn Press, 2012), Hum (Dikembe Press, 2014), Atalanta: an Anatomy (Essay Press, 2016), Question Like a Face (Image Text Ithaca, 2017), a collaboration with Jeff Clark and Red: A Different Shade for Each Person Reading the Story (PANK Books, 2020). She is faculty in the Creative Writing Program at Eastern Michigan University.

Life
Hume received her BA, MFA, and PhD degrees from Penn State University, Columbia University School of the Arts, and University of Denver, respectively. She has taught at Stuyvesant High School, Illinois Wesleyan University, The School of the Art Institute in Chicago and is currently a Professor of English at Eastern Michigan University, where she has worked since 2001. Hume has written and lectured on sound poetry, audio documentary poetics, voice, and radio from a feminist perspective. From 2006 to 2010 she hosted an internet radio program, Poetry Radio, featuring contemporary and historic performance arts, sound poetry, audio narratives, sound art, and collaborations between writers and musicians. She has collaborated on sonic arrangements for her work with Stephen Vitiello, Gregory Whitehead, Ben Miller, and other musicians. In the last decade, Hume's creative interests have shifted to creative nonfiction.

In 2002, she was one of two Americans invited to an international festival, “Days of Poetry and Wine” in Slovenia; in 2006, she taught a poetry workshop in St. Petersburg for Summer Literary Seminars, and in 2012 she taught a writing workshop on the walk in Lisbon for Disquiet: Dzanc Books International Literary Program.

Awards
Barnard Women Poets Prize 1999
 Green Rose Award
 2005 Best Book of the Year Award, Small Press Traffic
Fine Arts Work Center Fellow 1998-99
 Wurlitzer Foundation 2000
 Fund For Poetry 2002
 MacDowell Colony residency 2003

Works
Musca Domestica, Hume's first book of poetry and winner of the Barnard New Women Poets Prize, was published in 2000 by Beacon Press. Her second book, Alaskaphrenia, winner of the Green Rose Award and Small Press Traffic's Best Book of 2004 Award, was published in 2004 by New Issues. Her book, Shot, was published in 2010 by Counterpath Press. Her chapbook, a text image collaboration with her partner, Jeff Clark, Question Like a Face (ITI Press, 2017) was one of The Brooklyn Rail's"Best Nonfiction Book of 2017." Her book, Saturation Project, was reviewed in the New York Times.

Her prose and criticism have appeared in Harper's, Architecture and Culture, Conjunctions, Denver Quarterly, Contemporary Literature, Disability Studies Quarterly, Rain Taxi, Chicago Review, How2, Afgabe, Constant Critic, Womens Studies Quarterly as well as three volumes of a series by Wesleyan University Press, Poets in the 21st Century. In 2019, she edited and introduced a #MeToo focus of American Book Review.

 "Halloween and Stranger Danger," Boston Review
"LUNAR HALO", Typo 6
"Noctilucent Elegy"; "Ward"; "Her Night Lamb", Coconut 7
Various Readings of an Illegible Postcard

Lullaby, Ugly Duckling Presse, 2007   (a chapbook)

Anthologies
 
 
 No Crossing Guards (University of Iowa 2004)

References

External links
 "Christine Hume", Elective Affinities, October 5, 2010
 "Christine Hume", Here Comes Everybody, June 25, 2005

1968 births
Living people
Columbia University School of the Arts alumni
University of Denver alumni
Illinois Wesleyan University faculty
Eastern Michigan University faculty
American women poets
21st-century American poets
American women academics
21st-century American women writers